Take Me Out is a play by American playwright Richard Greenberg. After a staging at the Donmar Warehouse in London, it premiered Off-Broadway on September 5, 2002 at the Joseph Papp Public Theater. It made its Broadway debut on February 27, 2003 at the Walter Kerr Theatre, where it ran for 355 performances and won the 2003 Tony Award for Best Play. A Broadway revival opened at the Hayes Theater on April 4, 2022.

Background
While Glenn Burke was out to teammates and team owners in the 1970s and Billy Bean came out in 1999 after retiring from playing in Major League Baseball for eight seasons, at the time of the writing of this play no Major League Baseball player had ever come out to the public during his career. This play is the dramatic exploration of what such an event might be like.

Playwright Greenberg has stated that one of the compulsions for creating a baseball play was his complete immersion into the sport in 1999 after following the New York Yankees' (then-)record 114-win season the previous year, beginning with David Wells' perfect game. Many believe the inspiration for Lemming is former American Major League Baseball player Derek Jeter of the Yankees, and for racist pitcher Shane Mungitt, former National League pitcher John Rocker, then of the Atlanta Braves.

Plot
Much of the play is set in the locker room of a professional baseball team, and as such has an all-male cast that explores themes of homophobia, racism, class, and masculinity in sports.

Act I
Darren Lemming, a star mixed-race center fielder for the fictional Empires Major League Baseball team, comes out as gay. His friend and teammate Kippy Sunderstrom warns Darren that the team will feel uncomfortable about his sexual orientation, but is brushed off by Darren. As Kippy wonders why Darren chose that particular moment in time to come out, a flashback to a week earlier shows Darren having drinks with his best friend Davey Battle, a religious player on a rival team. Davey tells Darren that he should want his true nature known to the world. Later, Darren meets with his new accountant Mason Marzac, a gay man uninterested in baseball until Darren's coming out. 

The Empires fall into a slump, prompting relief pitcher Shane Mungitt to be brought up from the minor leagues. Shane tells the team that as a child, he was raised in orphanages after his father killed his mother and then himself in a murder-suicide. The team begins winning games again, but in a television interview, Mungitt expresses his discomfort with "colored people" on the team, and that he has to shower every night with a "faggot."

Act II
Shane is suspended due to the interview, causing the team to fall back into its slump. He writes an apology letter that is leaked to the public, which combined with the details about his tragic childhood, causes public sympathy to shift in his favor. Shane returns to the team, despite Darren's threat to retire in protest. In the locker room showers, Darren derides Shane for his racism and homophobia, and mockingly kisses him. In the game, Shane is sent to pitch against Davey Battle; the ball hits Davey's head, killing him.

Act III
In a flashback to Darren and Davey's final encounter, Davey angrily accuses Darren of using his straight-and-narrow public reputation to conceal his sexuality. Shane is permanently suspended from major league baseball, and arrested for questioning after players say they heard him muttering about wanting to "kill someone" before the game. He refuses to speak to the police, stating that he will only talk to Kippy. Kippy is joined by Darren, and as Kippy attempts to determine whether the pitch that killed Davey was intentional, Shane discloses that the apology letter was written by Kippy on Shane's behalf.

In narration, Kippy states to the audience that the Empires went on to win the World Series, and no charges were ever filed against Shane. Kippy expresses to Darren his desire to again be friends, and Darren invites Mason to the end-of-season party.

Productions

London premiere 
The show premiered at the Donmar Warehouse in London on June 20, 2002. The production was directed by Joe Mantello and starred Daniel Sunjata, Denis O'Hare, Neal Huff, Frederick Weller, Kevin Carroll, Dominic Fumusa, Gene Gabriel, Robert M. Jimenez, Joe Lisi, Kohl Sudduth, and James Yaegashi. It ran until August 3 of the same year.  

The production transferred off-Broadway to the Joseph Papp Public Theater later that year with the same cast and direction where it ran until 2003.

Original Broadway production 
The next year, the show transferred to the Walter Kerr Theatre on Broadway with the same cast with the exception of Dominic Fumusa, who was replaced by David Eigenberg. It opened on February 27, 2003. It featured designs by Scott Pask (scenic), Jess Goldstein (costume), Kevin Adams (lighting), and Janet Kalas (sound). At the 2003 Tony Awards, the production won the award for Best Play, Mantello won Best Direction of a Play, and O'Hare won Best Performance by a Featured Actor in a Play. It closed on January 4, 2004 after 355 performances.

Broadway revival 
A Broadway revival opened at the Hayes Theater on April 4, 2022. It was originally scheduled to begin previews on April 2, 2020 and officially open on April 23. However, due to the COVID-19 pandemic, the show suspended production on March 12. The cast is made up of Jesse Williams, Jesse Tyler Ferguson, Patrick J. Adams, Michael Oberholtzer, Brandon L. Dirden, Carl Lundstedt, Hiram Delgado, Ken Marks, Eduardo Ramos, Tyler Lansing Weaks, and Julian Cihi. The production is directed by Scott Ellis and has a production team including David Rockwell (scenic),  Linda Cho (costumes), Kenneth Posner (lighting), and Fitz Patton (sound). The production began previews on March 10, 2022 and officially opened on April 4. It closed on June 11. 

The Broadway revival has a very strict policy regarding phones and requires that all audience members place their phones in locked Yondr pouches prior to the show. However, on May 9, 2022, a video leaked online of a scene of Williams during the shower scene in which he is fully nude. The Actors' Equity Association, Jesse Tyler Ferguson, and 2nd Stage, owner the Helen Hayes Theater, released statements sharing their disgust. The latter stated they would be adding additional staff to enforce the "no phones" policy.

On June 12, 2022, the Broadway revival won Best Revival of a Play at the 75th Tony Awards.

The revival will be remounted at the Gerald Schoenfeld Theatre and begin performances on October 27, 2022 for a limited run of 14 weeks. Due to previous filming engagement, Adams was unable to return and Bill Heck assumed the role of Kippy for the return engagement.

Other productions

Singapore 

A limited-run production opened at the DBS Arts Centre in Singapore on January 8, 2014 and closed on January 31.

Notable casts

Awards and nominations

Original Broadway production

2022 Broadway Revival

TV series 
In August 2021, it was reported that Anonymous Content would be adapting the play into a limited television series. Jesse Williams will star and Scott Ellis will direct the pilot written by Greenberg.

References

Further reading

External links
 
 

2002 plays
Broadway plays
Major League Baseball mass media
Drama Desk Award-winning plays
LGBT-related plays
New York Drama Critics' Circle Award winners
Off-Broadway plays
Plays by Richard Greenberg
Tony Award-winning plays
West End plays
Plays about sport
Plays adapted into television shows